The list of ship launches in 1664 includes a chronological list of some ships launched in 1664.

References 

Lists of ship launches
1664 in transport
1660s ships